Ellen Hinsey (born 1960 in Boston) is an author, researcher and professor. Her work is concerned with history, ethics and democracy with a focus on Central and Eastern Europe. She has taught at the French graduate school the Ecole Polytechnique and Skidmore College's Paris program. She has most recently been a visiting professor at Georg-August-Universität in Göttingen.

Early life and education

Ellen Hinsey was born in 1960 in Boston, Massachusetts. She received a Bachelor of Fine Arts degree from Tufts University and a graduate degree from Université de Paris VII. For the last three decades she has lived in Europe.

Career
Hinsey's current work addresses authoritarianism. She has received a number of awards including fellowships from the American Academy in Berlin (2001) and the DAAD Berlin Künstlerprogramm Fellowship (2015), a Lannan Foundation Award, a Union League Civic/Arts Award, a Stover Prize and a Rona Jaffe Foundation Award.

She is a senior editor at the New American Studies Journal and is the international correspondent for The New England Review.

She has been an invited speaker at the University of Bonn, the American Academy in Berlin, the Polish Academy of Sciences, the University of Munich, Freie Universität Berlin and the Ecole Normale Supérieure, among others. She has been an invited author at international festivals and other venues including The New School (New York), Poetry International (Royal Festival Hall), the London Book Fair, the Leipzig Book Fair, the International Literaturfestival Berlin, Cuirt International Festival of Literature, the Dublin Festival of Literature, the Sorbonne, the University of Łódź and The Arsenal Book Festival (Kiev) among others.

Work

Hinsey is the author of six books and has edited and translated three others.

Hinsey's collection of essays, Mastering the Past: Contemporary Central and Eastern Europe and the Rise of Illiberalism (Telos Press, 2017), examines new forms of authoritarianism. It includes first-hand accounts and analyses of the impact of the 2012 Russian presidential election and its aftermath, the rise of populism in Poland and the constitutional crisis, Hungarian illiberalism, Václav Havel's ethical legacy and post-1989 German reconstruction. A selection of these essays first appeared in The New England Review.

In 2018, The Illegal Age was published (Arc Publications, 2018). It is a philosophical-poetic investigation into the twentieth-century's legacy of totalitarianism and the rise of political illegality. Reviewer Chris Edgoose noted: "The word ‘important’ is over-used (...) but in the case of Ellen Hinsey's The Illegal Age it seems to me the only appropriate adjective (...). It is not a book we can afford to ignore. Like Robert O. Paxton’s 2005 The Anatomy of Fascism, this is a book which approaches its subject with the absolute clarity it requires." The book was the UK Poetry Book Society's 2018 Autumn Choice.

Her memoir collaboration with Lithuanian dissident and poet Tomas Venclova, Magnetic North: Conversations with Tomas Venclova /Ellen Hinsey, examines postwar Eastern European totalitarianism, dissidence, culture and ethics. It has been published in German, English, Lithuanian, Ukrainian, Polish and Russian editions, and was nominated for Lithuania's 2018 Book of the Year.

Beginning in February 2002, she traveled to the International Criminal Tribunal for the former Yugoslavia in The Hague to listen to witness sessions. Her third book, Update on the Descent, addressed this experience, and is an anatomy of political violence. It was published in 2009 by Notre Dame University Press and Bloodaxe Books and has been called "an urgent, probing book." Reviewing the 2017 German translation (Matthes & Seitz), literary critic Gregor Dotzauer called it an "anthropology of violence," and notes that "Er zeigt auch, wozu eine Poesie in der Lage ist, die bereit ist, es mit so ziemlich allen Furien dieser Welt aufzunehmen."

Her second book, The White Fire of Time (Wesleyan University Press, 2002 / Bloodaxe Books, 2003) was written after a family tragedy, and explores ethics and renewal.

Hinsey's first book, Cities of Memory, draws on her experiences at the Berlin Wall on the weekend of November 9, 1989, as well as in Prague during the Velvet Revolution. The book received the Yale Series Award and was published by Yale University Press in 1996.

Her work has appeared in The New York Times, The New Yorker, Die Welt, The Irish Times, Der Tagesspiegel, Gazeta Wyborcza, The New England Review and The Paris Review, among other publications.

Translations

Hinsey is the editor and co-translator of The Junction: Selected Poems of Tomas Venclova (Bloodaxe Books, 2008). Her other translations include The Secret Piano, by Zhu Xiao-Mei, an account of growing up under the Cultural Revolution (Amazon Crossing, 2012) and Wild Harmonies by Hélène Grimaud (Riverhead/Penguin Books, 2005).

Honors and awards

 2018 UK Poetry Book Society, Autumn Choice, The Illegal Age
 2017 SWR Bestenliste July/August
 2015 DAAD Berliner Künstlerprogramm Fellow
 2014 National Poetry Series (finalist)
 2013 Pushcart Prize nomination for "The New Opposition in Hungary"
 2012 Pushcart Prize nomination for "Death in the Forest"
 2007 The Stover Memorial Award / The Southwest Review
 2001 Berlin Prize Fellowship / The American Academy in Berlin
 2001 The Union League Civic and Arts Poetry Prize / Poetry
 1998 Ledig-Rowohlt Foundation Fellowship, Château de Lavigny
 1998 Rona Jaffe Foundation Writers' Award
 1996 The Yale Younger Poets Prize
 Lannan Foundation Award

Bibliography

Books
 The Illegal Age (Arc Publications, 2018) , 
 Mastering the Past: Contemporary Central and Eastern Europe and the Rise of Illiberalism (Telos Press, 2017) , 
 Magnetic North: Conversations with Tomas Venclova (Rochester University Press, 2017 / Boydell & Brewer, 2017) , 
Foreign language editions
- Der magnetische Norden (German edition: Suhrkamp, 2017)
- Nelyginant šiaurė magnetą (Lithuanian edition: Apostrofa, 2017)
- магнітну північ (Ukrainian edition: Dukh i Litera, 2017)
- Magnetyczna Północ. Rozmawia Ellen Hinsey (Polish edition: Zeszyty Literackie, 2017)
 Update on the Descent (University of Notre Dame Press, 2009 / Bloodaxe Books, 2009) , 
Foreign language editions
- Des Menschen Element (German edition: Matthes & Seitz, 2017)
 The White Fire of Time (Wesleyan University Press, 2002 / Bloodaxe Books, 2003) , 
 Cities of Memory (Yale University Press, 1996) , 
 The Junction: Selected Poems of Tomas Venclova, editor and co-translator, (Bloodaxe Books, 2009) ,  
 The Secret Piano: From Mao's Labor Camps to Bach's Goldberg Variations, by Zhu Xiao-Mei, translation by Ellen Hinsey (AmazonCrossing, 2012)
 Wild Harmonies, by Hélène Grimaud, translation by Ellen Hinsey (Riverhead Press, 2006) ,

Selected articles

 "Genug ist genug!: Warum polnische Frauen der PiS-Regierung den Kampf ansagen", Der Tagesspiegel, 10 November 2020
 "Polnische Verhältnisse: Die verratene Aufklärung", Der Tagesspiegel, 9 July 2020
 "Und dennoch lebt der Traum von Martin Luther King", Der Tagesspiegel, 9 June 2020
 "A State of Fog: Making Sense of the Polish (Non)Election", The New England Review, 16 June 2020
 "Miglota padėtis" (Lithuanian translation of "A State of Fog"), IQ, 7 June 2020
 "Bożonarodzeniowy list nadziei i solidarności", Gazeta Wyborcza, 4 January 2018
 "Poland’s Constitutional Crisis and the Future Legality of Europe: A Tragedy in Five Acts", The New England Review, 2018
 "The Rise of the Illiberal Elites", TELOSscope, July 3, 2017
 "The Illegal Age / Das Zeitalter der Rechtswidrigkeit", Der Tagesspiegel, January 31, 2017
 "The Illegal Age" The Irish Times, November 23, 2016
 "Poland's Illiberal Challenge: A Dialogue with Rafal Pankowski", The New England Review, 2016
 "Putin Cracks Down: The Russian Presidential Election and Its Aftermath", The New England Review, 2013
 "Death in the Forest", The New England Review, 2011
 "The New Opposition in Hungary", The New England Review, 2012
 "Eternal Return: Berlin Journal, 1989–2009", The New England Review, 2010

Critical studies of Hinsey

 2011: Poetic Memory: The Forgotten Self in Plath, Howe, Hinsey, and Glück by Uta Gosmann, 
 2012: (Un)concealing the Hedgehog by Paulina Ambrozy, 
 2008: Another Language: Poetic Experiments in Britain and North America by Kornelia Freitag (ed.),

References

External links 
 Mariah Whelan, "An interview with Ellen Hinsey", Bath Magg, December 2020
 Alexander Booth, ""The Braille of a Restless Lake", Tikkun, 2019
 Chris Edgoose, "" woodbeepoet.com, 9 October 2018
 Rolf Birkholz, "Exerzitien am Abgrund", Am Erker, 2017
 Ellen Hinsey, "Nachdenken über die Tyrannei", deutschlandfunk.de, 20 July 2017 (translation by Brigitte van Kann)
 Gregor Dotzauer, "Der radikale Wille", Der Tagesspiegel, 23 July 2017
 Susan Wheatley, "An Interview with Ellen Hinsey", Poetry International, 3 October 2009
 University of Notre Dame Press 
 "Update on the Last Judgment" at Poetry Foundation.org
 Review of The White Fire of Time, Critique Magazine 
 Author's website

1960 births
Living people
Tufts University alumni
University of Paris alumni
American women poets
Rona Jaffe Foundation Writers' Award winners
21st-century American poets
21st-century American women writers